Eoviscaccia is an extinct genus of chinchillid rodent that lived during the Early Oligocene (Tinguirirican) to the Early Miocene (Colhuehuapian) in what is now South America. Fossils of this genus have been found in the Cerro Bandera, Chichinales, Fray Bentos, and Sarmiento Formations of Argentina, the Salla Formation of Bolivia, and the Abanico Formation of Chile.

Taxonomy 
Eoviscaccia was first described by María Guiomar Vucetich in 1989 based on remains found in the Salla Formation of Bolivia and the Sarmiento Formation of Chubut Province, Argentina, with the proposed type species being Eoviscaccia boliviana. Two other species, E. australis and E. frassinettii, were both named in 1989 and 2012 respectively, with E. australis being found in Chubut, Entre Ríos, Neuquén, and Río Negro Provinces of Argentina, while E. frassinettii was found in the Abanico Formation of Chile.

The following cladogram of the Caviomorpha is based on Busker et al. 2020, showing the position of Eoviscaccia.

References 

Chinchillidae
Miocene mammals of South America
Oligocene mammals of South America
Miocene rodents
Oligocene rodents
Colhuehuapian
Deseadan
Tinguirirican
Neogene Argentina
Paleogene Argentina
Fossils of Argentina
Paleogene Bolivia
Fossils of Bolivia
Paleogene Chile
Fossils of Chile
Fossil taxa described in 1989
Prehistoric rodent genera
Paraná Basin
Neuquén Basin
Golfo San Jorge Basin
Cerro Bandera Formation
Chichinales Formation
Sarmiento Formation